Kalalaq (also Romanized as Kalālaq; also known as Kalalagh and Kalāleh) is a village in Peyghan Chayi Rural District, in the Central District of Kaleybar County, East Azerbaijan Province, Iran. At the 2006 census, its population was 512, in 107 families.

References 

Populated places in Kaleybar County